Fraser Heights is a neighbourhood of Guildford, a town centre in the city of Surrey, British Columbia. Bounded by Highway 1 to the south, Highway 15 to the east and the Fraser River to the north, with most homes having a view of the Fraser River and Coquitlam mountain.

Demographics
Residents of the neighbourhood consist mostly of upper-income families and zoned for large single family homes. The population was estimated to be about 25,000 people in 2014.

References

Neighbourhoods in Surrey, British Columbia
Populated places on the Fraser River